Established in 1997, Marathonbet is a global online sports betting company offering pre-match and live betting markets across a range of sports and live events through its online sportsbook and casino products.

Operations 
Marathonbet was started in the CIS (Commonwealth of Independent States) in 1997 and became one of the first betting operators to launch an online service in 2002.

In 2013, the company launched a mobile app sportsbook for Android, iOS and tablet devices.

In September of 2017 Marathonbet announced Natalia Zavodnik as their new chief executive, replacing the previous executive Viktor Hoffmann who retired the same year.

In April 2022 Marathonbet announced the company will be withdrawing their UK website and operations from the 14th of April 2022.

Companies operating under the Marathonbet brand are licensed in Alderney, Belarus, Italy, Spain and Curacao.

Partnerships 
In November 2019, Marathonbet announced their partnership deal with Real Madrid.

In October 2020, Marathonbet announced a partnership with Spanish iGaming provider MGA Games.

References

Online gambling companies of Russia